Michael Throckmorton was a 16th-century English Catholic who went into exile with Cardinal Pole during the reign of Henry VIII of England. 

He was attainted of his lands and put in the Tower of London for criticising the King's attempt to annul his marriage to his first wife, Katherine of Aragon. He was the brother of George Throckmorton.

He is the narrator and central character of Peter Walker's novel, The Courier's Tale.

References

Year of birth missing
Year of death missing
16th-century English people
People of the Tudor period
Throckmorton family